Stanislav Atrashkevich (born 22 October 2002) is a Belarusian professional footballer who plays for Smorgon on loan from Isloch Minsk Raion.

References

External links 
 
 

2002 births
Living people
Footballers from Minsk
Belarusian footballers
Association football midfielders
FC Isloch Minsk Raion players
FC Arsenal Dzerzhinsk players
FC Smorgon players